The Fortunate Isles or Isles of the Blessed (makárōn nêsoi) were semi-legendary islands in the Atlantic Ocean, variously treated as a simple geographical location and as a winterless earthly paradise inhabited by the heroes of Greek mythology.

Legend
According to Greek mythology, the islands were reserved for those who had chosen to be reincarnated three times, and managed to be judged as especially pure enough to gain entrance to the Elysian Fields all three times.

Accounts
Flavius Philostratus' Life of Apollonius of Tyana (v.2) says, "And they also say that the Islands of the Blessed are to be fixed by the limits of Libya where they rise towards the uninhabited promontory." In this geography Libya was considered to extend westwards through Mauretania "as far as the mouth of the river Salex, some nine hundred stadia, and beyond that point a further distance which no one can compute, because when you have passed this river Libya is a desert which no longer supports a population".

Plutarch, who refers to the "fortunate isles" several times in his writings, locates them firmly in the Atlantic in his vita of Sertorius.  Sertorius, when struggling against a chaotic civil war in the closing years of the Roman Republic, had tidings from mariners of certain islands a few days' sail from Hispania:

It was from these men that Sertorius learned facts so beguiling that he made it his life's ambition to find the islands and retire there.

Pliny the Elder's Natural History adds to the obligatory description—that they "abound in fruit and birds of every kind"—the unexpected detail "These islands, however, are greatly annoyed by the putrefying bodies of monsters, which are constantly thrown up by the sea".

The Isles are mentioned in Book II of A True History by the Greek satirist Lucian of Samosata. The author makes fun of the heroes residing there by giving an account of their petty squabbles as presented to the court of the magistrate, Rhadamanthus. He goes on to describe other observations of how the residents occupy their time, using every opportunity to satirise both contemporary life and Greek mythology.

Ptolemy used these islands as the reference for the measurement of geographical longitude and they continued to play the role of defining the prime meridian through the Middle Ages.

See also 

Greek mythology in popular culture
Hesperides
Snake Island (Black Sea), "Isle of the Blessed" in Greek legend
Annwn
Brittia
Elysium
Mag Mell
Tír na nÓg, the Isle of the Ever-Young
Avalon, the Isle of the Blessed
Aman, the "blessed realm" of Tolkien's works
Buyan
Macaronesia
Vinland
Great Ireland
Saint Brendan's Island

Notes 

Locations in Celtic mythology
Locations in Greek mythology
Mythological islands
Death in Greek mythology
Conceptions of heaven
Macaronesia